Cnemaspis laoensis, also known as the Lao rock gecko, is a species of gecko endemic to Laos.

References

Cnemaspis
Reptiles described in 2010